Jacob Gibble Meyer is a former President of Elizabethtown College.

Meyer served as president from 1921 until 1924.

Meyer residence hall is named after him.

References

Presidents of Elizabethtown College